CANVAS Outdoor Museum Show is a yearly craftsmanship occasion held during the second seven day stretch of November in Midtown West Palm Ocean side, Florida. The show was made by West Palm Ocean side exhibition proprietor Nicole Henry of Nicole Henry Artistic work, and fills in as a public stage for visual specialists in the class of contemporary craftsmanship, wall painting workmanship, road workmanship, public craftsmanship, video craftsmanship and site-explicit establishment workmanship. Its latest creation likewise incorporated the midtown of adjacent Lake Worth, Florida.

The show's central goal is to carry crafted by global craftsmen to public spaces for an outside historical center experience where the specialists are given the stage to make site-explicit establishments on open foundation. With fruitful historical center shows in 2015, 2016, and 2017, downtown West Palm Bech has turned into a significant vacationer location all year as guests from everywhere the world visit to see the open air craftsmanship gallery as it develops every year.an annual art event held during the second week of November in Downtown West Palm Beach, Florida. The show was created by West Palm Beach gallery owner Nicole Henry of Nicole Henry Fine Art, and serves as a public platform for visual artists in the genres of contemporary art, mural art, street art, public art, video art and site-specific installation art. Its most recent production also included the downtown of nearby Lake Worth, Florida.

The show's mission is to bring the works of international artists to public spaces for an outdoor museum experience where the artists are given the platform to create site-specific installations on public infrastructure. With successful museum shows in 2015, 2016, and 2017, downtown West Palm Bech has become an important tourist destination year-round as visitors from all over the world visit to see the outdoor art museum as it grows each year.

Artists

Each show features 18 to 20 rising and established artists from around the world as well as a Local Showdown in which local artists complete to be in the next show's lineup.

The November 2015 inaugural show presented a lineup of 20 artists that came from the United States, Argentina, Brazil, Belgium, United Kingdom, Germany and Puerto Rico, including: 2Alas, Bik-Ismo, CASE Maclaim, Cheryl Maeder, Greg Mike, Herakut, Jean-Luc Moerman, Jeremy Penn, José Bedia Valdés, Kai, Katja Loher, Kobra, Pastel, Registered Artists, Michael Dweck, Ron English, Sean Yoro (aka HULA), WRDSMTH, and ZEUS.

Over 18 site-specific installations and large-scale murals were created around Downtown, West Palm Beach on select buildings and infrastructure in various locations, including the City Hall Courtyard, Royal Park Bridge, Fern Street, and The Whitney.

The 2015 CANVAS Local Showdown was held in Northwood Village, where seven local artists competed to be on the 2016 CANVAS lineup. Artist Amanda Valdes won the competition by popular public vote on the CANVAS app.

In 2016, the show expanded to include nearby Lake Worth, and the artists included Amanda Valdez, Astro, Case Maclaim, Greg Mike, Griffin Loop, HEC One Love, Hoxxoh, HULA, Hybycozo, Laura Kimpton, Lonac, Lori Pratico, Pichiavo, Pipsqueak Was Here!!!, Sipros, WRDSMTH, and ZEUS. The nations represented were the UK, the US, Brazil, The Netherlands, Spain, Croatia, Germany, and France.

The 2017 show also included both West Palm Beach and Lake Worth, and several of the artists’ work in previous shows was so highly regarded they were invited back. Newcomers include Cyrcle, D*Face, Jennifer Chaparro (winner of the Local Showdown), Kobra, and Okuda.

Charity

In August 2015, a board of directors was formed to establish CANVAS Art Charities, an official not-for-profit 501(c)(3). The charity funds and curates year-round programming and events to support art in public spaces. Artist Dean Zeus Coleman won the artist residency where he will create an installation in Downtown Abacoa in Jupiter, Florida.

Board of directors
 Nicole Henry, owner, Nicole Henry Fine Art
 Elin Nordegren, philanthropist
 Alex Foster, co-founder and managing principal at Atlas Partners
 Michael Weinberg, senior vice president, Merrill Lynch
 William Corrente, founding partner, CS Capital Group 
 Michelle Grande, philanthropist, Berlin Family Foundation
 Roy Assad, managing partner, Human Capital Group & COO of M&V Magazine

Residency artists

 2015: Dean Zeus Coleman: Abacoa, Jupiter, Florida

References

External links
 Website

Art in Florida
West Palm Beach, Florida
Tourist attractions in Palm Beach County, Florida
Annual events in Florida